Alec Utgoff (born 1 March 1986) is a Soviet-born English actor. He pursued acting and graduated from the prestigious Drama Centre London. He is known for playing the role of Aleksandr Borovsky in Jack Ryan: Shadow Recruit and Dr. Alexei in the third season of Stranger Things. His other notable roles include Alexi in San Andreas (2015), Dmitri in Mortdecai (2015) and Yuri/Dimitri in The Wrong Mans (2015).

Early life
Utgoff was born in Kyiv, Ukrainian SSR, Soviet Union (now Kyiv, Ukraine) to Roza, a musical conductor, and Vladimir, a heart surgeon who is an honored doctor of modern-day Ukraine. In 1996, at the age of 10, he moved to London, England. His brother Alan, an economist, lives in Moscow and his parents still live in Kyiv. Ethnically he is half Russian, half Ossetian with some ethnic German ancestry on his father's side. He is fluent in Russian, Ukrainian and English.

Filmography

Films

TV series

References

External links
 
 

Living people
21st-century British male actors
British male film actors
British male television actors
Male actors from London
Alumni of the Drama Centre London
Ukrainian emigrants to the United Kingdom
1986 births